"Surfer's Hymn" is the final single from Panda Bear's fourth solo album, Tomboy. It was released as a limited edition 7" by Kompakt on March 28, 2011 and later released digitally. In suit with the other three, the single features artwork by Noah's fellow Jane member, Scott Mou. An unofficial yet approved music video, directed by m ss ng p eces was released for the song. Reportedly, Tomboy producer and former Spacemen 3 member, Sonic Boom posted the video to the Animal Collective fan board, Collected Animals, however this has not been confirmed. The 7" also features a remix by electronic artist Actress.

Track listing

References

2011 singles
2011 songs